The 2017–18 Nemzeti Bajnokság I (also known as 2017–18 OTP Bank Liga), also known as NB I, was the 119th season of top-tier football in Hungary. The league was officially named OTP Bank Liga for sponsorship reasons. Honvéd were the defending champions, having won their fourteenth Hungarian league title. As in the previous season, 12 teams competed for the championship title and played 33 matches. The fixtures were published on 14 July 2017.

On 20 June 2017, the rounds were drawn by the Hungarian Football Federation. The 33 rounds was divided into two parts. 19 rounds were played in 2017 and the remaining 14 in 2018.

Teams
MTK and Gyirmót finished the 2016–17 Nemzeti Bajnokság I in the last two places and thus were relegated to NB II division.

The two relegated teams were replaced with the top two teams in 2016–17 Nemzeti Bajnokság II, champion Puskás Akadémia and runner-up Balmazújváros, each having the required licence for top-division play.

Stadium and locations
Following is the list of clubs competed in the league this season, with their location, stadium and stadium capacity.

Notes
Note 1: Diósgyőri Stadion was demolished in 2016, while their proposed stadium, Diósgyőri Stadion was under construction. Therefore, Diósgyőr played their home matches in Nagyerdei Stadion, since their original stadium, Diósgyőri Stadion (1939) was demolished. From 5 May 2018, Diósgyőr played their home matches at the new Diósgyőri Stadion.
Note 2: Szombathelyi Haladás VSE played their home matches at the Káposztás utcai Stadion, in Sopron since their original stadium, Rohonci úti Stadion was demolished in 2016. From 21 November 2017 Haladás played their home matches at the new Haladás Sportkomplexum.
Note 3: Vasas's original stadium, Illovszky Rudolf Stadion (1960) was demolished, while their proposed stadium, Illovszky Rudolf Stadion was under construction.
Note 4: Videoton's original stadium, Sóstói Stadion (1967) was demolished in 2016, while their proposed stadium, Sóstói Stadion was under construction.

Personnel and kits
Following is the list of clubs competed in the league this season, with their manager, captain, kit manufacturer and shirt sponsor.

Note: Flags indicate national team as has been defined under FIFA eligibility rules. Players and Managers may hold more than one non-FIFA nationality.

Managerial changes

League table

Positions by round

Results
In the first 22 rounds each team played against every other team home-and-away in a round-robin format. In the remaining 11 rounds, the first six placed teams from the previous season played six matches at home and five matches away, and the remaining six teams played five matches at home and six matches away.

Rounds 1–22

Rounds 23–33

Season statistics

Top goalscorers

Updated to games played on 3 June 2018

Hat-tricks

Attendances

See also
 2017–18 Magyar Kupa
 2018 Magyar Kupa Final
 2017–18 Nemzeti Bajnokság II
 2017–18 Nemzeti Bajnokság III
 2017–18 Megyei Bajnokság I

References

External links
  
 Official rules 
 uefa.com

Nemzeti Bajnokság I seasons
1
Hungary